Meet the In-Laws is a 2017 Nigerian film written by Rita Onwurah and directed by Niyi Akinmolayan. The movie stars various actors and actresses from the Nigerian movie industry such as; Adeniyi Johnson, Lilian Esoro, Kenneth Okolie, Dele Odule, Dayo Amusa, Tina Mba amongst others.

Selected Cast 

 Adeniyi Johnson as Dapo
 Lilian Esoro
 Dele Odule as Papa Dapo
 Amaechi Muonagor as Okoro
 Dayo Amusa as Taiwo
 Tina Mba as Iya Dapo
 Kenneth Okolie as Chijioke

Synopsis 
Meet the In-Laws is a story of two young adults who fell in love and got engaged, it was later discovered that the union would not go as planned as their respective parents oppose of the union since the man is from Yoruba tribe and the woman is from the Ibo tribe, this caused a lot of chaos and later on, the couples find out that the actual reason for the opposition of their respective parents to the marriage is much deeper than just tribal differences.

Nomination and recognition 
Amaechi Muonagor was recognized and nominated for his role in Meet the in-Laws film in the 2017 Africa Magic Viewers' Choice Awards under the category for Best actor in a comedy.

References

 
2017 films
English-language Netflix original films
English-language Nigerian films